The MTV Europe Music Award for Best Alternative has been awarded since 1997.

Winners and nominees
Winners are listed first and highlighted in bold. 

† indicates an MTV Video Music Award for Best Alternative Video–winning artist.
‡ indicates an MTV Video Music Award for Best Alternative Video–nominated artist that same year.

Hayley Williams of Paramore and Lana Del Rey are the only female artists that have won more than once.

1990s

2000s

2010s

2020s

See also
 MTV Video Music Award for Best Alternative Video

References

MTV Europe Music Awards
Alternative rock
Awards established in 1997
1997 establishments in New York City